Oreocereus celsianus, or the old man of the mountain is a member of the family Cactaceae native to the high lands of the Andes in South America, and is named for its fluffy white hair, which may protect it from intense sunlight and extreme temperatures.

Distribution
'''Oreocereus celsianus occurs naturally at high altitudes across Argentina, Bolivia and Peru.

Description
The ribbed body, typically with eleven ribs, has many long, brown spines and blooms in spring with long, tubular red flowers.

Ecology
Pollinated by hummingbirds in spring.

Cultivation
Prefers full sun and light watering. Propagates from seed.

References

Huntington Botanical Gardens
Desert Gardening

Trichocereeae
Flora of South America
Plants described in 1850